Darrun Hilliard II (born April 13, 1993) is an American professional basketball player for Maccabi Tel Aviv of the Israeli Basketball Premier League and the EuroLeague.

Hilliard attended Liberty High School in Bethlehem, Pennsylvania, where he was a two-time Associated Press first-team selection. As a high school senior, he averaged 19.7 points per game. Hilliard committed to play college basketball for the Villanova Wildcats and coach Jay Wright. He showed steady improvement every year, going from 4.8 points per game as a freshman to 14.3 points per game as a senior as he helped Villanova reach the NCAA Tournament in three straight seasons. As a senior, he was named to the first-team All-Big East and was honored as Big 5 Player of the Year.

Early life
Hilliard was born on April 13, 1993 to Charlene Jenkins and Darrun Hilliard. His mother is a representative for an insurance company. His father played basketball at the high school level and first introduced his son to the sport when he was five years old. The younger Hilliard also played football growing up, but preferred basketball. His favorite NBA player was Allen Iverson. He used to bike to Philadelphia Eagles practices as a kid.

High school career
Hilliard attended Liberty High School in Bethlehem, Pennsylvania, where he was a two-time Associated Press first-team selection. Despite eating, writing, and throwing a football right handed, Hilliard shoots left-handed. As a freshman, he measured 6'1. His parents split up after his freshman year, and he developed a unique bond with Liberty assistant coach Mike Bachman. As a junior, he averaged 18 points and six rebounds per game and shot 52 percent from the field. Hilliard led the Hurricanes to PIAA state semifinals, where Liberty lost to Penn Wood. In the loss to Penn Wood, Hilliard had 26 points. He was named The Morning Call player of the year as a junior. In addition, he was selected to the First Team Class AAAA.

Hilliard averaged 19.7 points per game as a senior. He was named Express-Times player of the year after leading the Hurricanes to the second round of the PIAA playoffs. Hilliard scored 1,413 points in his high school career, finishing second in Liberty High School history. He committed to Villanova in November 2010. When Hilliard informed his mother he was receiving a full scholarship to Villanova, she did not understand and was trying to figure how much she would have to pay for her son's education.

College career

Freshman
Villanova coach Jay Wright considered redshirting Hilliard in his freshman season, but Wright decided against it after a rash of injuries to his players. He had 13 points in back-to-back games against Penn and Missouri in December 2011. As a freshman, Hilliard averaged 4.8 points, 2.5 rebounds and 18.1 minutes per game in 29 games and shot 29.2 percent from behind the 3-point arc. During the season, he reached out to his family and friends to see if he made the right decision to come to Villanova. He said, "Freshman year was probably my toughest year of basketball", due to difficulties in adjusting to a new coach and teammates. He described himself as a mentally unstable 17-year-old.

Sophomore
In his sophomore season (2012–13), he averaged 11.4 points in just under 30 minutes a game. This proved to be his breakout season and he would go on to start all 34 games that year. He helped Villanova defeat a few top five teams that season. In a comeback win over #5 Louisville on January 22, he made a 3-point play after making a steal at halfcourt which helped spark the rally. In a 75–71 overtime victory over #3 Syracuse on January 26, 2013, he had 25 points and six assists in 38 minutes. As a result of his play against Syracuse, Hilliard was honored as Big East Player of the Week and Oscar Robertson National Player of the Week. He also helped them beat then #5 Georgetown on March 6 by the score of 67–57. In that game, he had 14 points and three steals.

Villanova enjoyed a 20–14 season after a down year and reached the NCAA Tournament where they were seeded ninth and matched up with eight seed North Carolina in the first round. Hilliard had a strong showing in a 78–71 loss to North Carolina, scoring 18 points.

Junior
Hilliard improved in most offensive categories in the 2013–14 season, his junior year. He averaged 14.3 points per game that season and improved his three-point shooting percentage to 41.4 percent (up from 31.5 percent the year before). He made 70 three-pointers that year out of 169 attempts. Hilliard scored 20 points on 8-of-13 shooting against Marquette in a 94–85 victory on January 25, 2014. In an 82–79 win over Providence, he hit a crucial 3-pointer with a minute left in overtime. In a 73–56 win over Marquette on March 2 at the Wells Fargo Center, he established a new career high with 26 points on 7-of-11 shooting from the field.

Villanova compiled a 29–5 record and won the Big East regular season championship and Battle for Atlantis title despite not being ranked in the preseason. In the 2014 NCAA Tournament, Hilliard scored 16 points to help Villanova get past Milwaukee. Villanova lost to eventual national champion Connecticut in the Round of 32, with Hilliard adding 13 points in the 77–65 loss. He was an honorable mention all-Big East selection at the conclusion of the regular season. He shared Big East Most Improved Player award with teammate Daniel Ochefu. Hilliard joined teammate Ryan Arcidiacono on the All-Big 5 Second Team.

Senior

Coming into the 2014–15 season, Hilliard was named to the Preseason Second Team All-Big East. He averaged 14.3 points, 3.6 rebounds, and 2.1 assists per game as a senior. Villanova was ranked in the top ten for most of the season thanks to a balanced offense. Hilliard scored 23 points on December 20 in an overtime victory over Syracuse, hitting 9-of-17 shots. He hit two free throws to give the Wildcats the first lead of the game in overtime before being kicked in the face and tested for concussion-like symptoms. Against Creighton on January 25, 2015, he scored 24 points and made 6-of-10 three-pointers in a 71–50 victory at home. On February 14, in a 78–75 victory over Butler, Hilliard scored a career-high 31 points and also set a career high with 8 three-pointers made out of 13 attempts. He also hit the game-winning three-pointer with 1.5 seconds to play in the game. Eight of his nine field goals in that game were three-pointers, and his eight rebounds were one short of a career-high. He averaged 18.7 points during a nine-game stretch that included the Butler game.

Hilliard led the Wildcats to a 33–3 season. His final game at Villanova was a 71–68 upset at the hands of N.C. State in the NCAA Tournament Round of 32, despite contributing 27 points. Hilliard finished his Villanova career with 1,511 points, 18th highest in school history; 400 rebounds; and 176 steals. Hilliard was a 2014–15 Men's All-District II Team selection by the U.S. Basketball Writers Association. The Sporting News selected him to be a Second Team All American. Hilliard was one of three players, along with LaDontae Henton and Kris Dunn, to be unanimously named to the All Big East First Team. He was named to the First Team All-District V by the National Association of Basketball Coaches, and was named Big 5 Player of the Year. After the season, he was invited to the Portsmouth Invitational Tournament.

Professional career

Detroit Pistons (2015–2017)
Prior to the 2015 NBA draft, Hilliard signed with James Dunleavy as his agent. He was listed in the 55–70 range among NBA Draft prospects by several media agencies. On June 25, 2015, Hilliard was selected 38th overall by the Detroit Pistons in the second round of the draft. Hilliard attributed the decision to a productive workout with the team. After averaging 9.4 points per game in Orlando Summer League play, on July 20, Hilliard signed a three-year deal with the Pistons, with one year being guaranteed. Coach Stan Van Gundy praised Hilliard's shooting prowess, despite a poor showing in the Summer League.

He broke his nose during training camp after engaging in a pickup game. The injury required surgery and he needed to wear a mask. On November 23, he made his NBA debut in a 109–88 loss against the Milwaukee Bucks, recording two points and three rebounds in 12 minutes. During his rookie season, he received multiple assignments to the Grand Rapids Drive, the Pistons' D-League affiliate.

On June 30, 2016, Hilliard was ruled out of the 2016 NBA Summer League after he suffered a stress fracture of the lower back. During the 2016–17 season, Hilliard had multiple assignments with the Grand Rapids Drive.

On June 28, 2017, Hilliard was traded to the Houston Rockets for cash considerations, then immediately got traded to the Los Angeles Clippers as part of the trade that sent Chris Paul to Houston. A day later, he was waived by the Clippers.

San Antonio Spurs (2017–2018)
On September 11, 2017, Hilliard signed a two-way contract with the San Antonio Spurs, meaning he would be available to split playing time between San Antonio and their NBA G League affiliate, the Austin Spurs. On February 23, 2018, in his first game in the G-League in a month, Hilliard contributed 31 points, five assists, one rebound and one steal in a 134–123 loss to the Texas Legends. He had 22 points, four rebounds, three assists, one steal and one block in a win against the Reno Bighorns on March 10. He posted 21.2 points per game for Austin.

Kirolbet Baskonia (2018–2019)
On August 13, 2018, Hilliard signed a one-year deal with Kirolbet Baskonia of the Liga ACB and the EuroLeague. He averaged 9.4 points, 2.9 rebounds and 1.1 assists per game.

CSKA Moscow (2019–2021)
On July 3, 2019, Hilliard signed a one-year deal with the Russian team CSKA Moscow of the VTB United League and the EuroLeague. He scored 14 points in a win against his former team Baskonia on January 17, 2020. On June 25, 2020, Hilliard extended the contract for one year. He scored a career-high 31 points on November 11, in a win against Baskonia. During the 2020–21 season, he averaged 8.7 points, 2.2 rebounds, and 1.1 assists per game. On June 18, 2021, Hilliard officially parted ways with the Russian club.

Bayern Munich (2021–2022)
On July 16, 2021, Hilliard signed with FC Bayern Munich of the Basketball Bundesliga.  During the 2021–22 season, he averaged 12.7 points, 2.6 rebounds, and 2.1 assists per game.

Maccabi Tel Aviv (2022–present) 
On June 26, 2022, Hilliard signed with Maccabi Tel Aviv of the Israeli Premier League and the EuroLeague.

National team career
Hilliard played with the senior United States national team at the 2017 FIBA AmeriCup, where he won a gold medal. He was named to the All-Tournament Team.

Career statistics

EuroLeague

|-
| style="text-align:left;"| 2018–19
| style="text-align:left;"| Baskonia
| 34 || 11 || 20.5 || .412 || .322 || .775 || 2.9 || 1.1 || .7 || .1 || 9.4 || 6.9
|-
| style="text-align:left;"| 2019–20
| style="text-align:left;" rowspan=2| CSKA Moscow
| 27 || 12 || 20.1 || .404 || .412 || .796 || 2.4 || 1.2 || .6 || .1 || 10.6 || 7.1
|-
| style="text-align:left;"| 2020–21
| 37 || 30|| 19.2 || .441 || .327 || .857|| 2.0 || 1.1 || .6 || .2 || 8.7 || 5.9
|- class="sortbottom"
| style="text-align:center;" colspan="2"| Career
| 30 || 11 || 20.4 || .408 || .367 || .785 || 2.6 || 1.1 || .6 || .1 || 10 || 7

NBA

Regular season

|-
| style="text-align:left;"| 
| style="text-align:left;"| Detroit
| 38 || 2 || 10.1 || .397 || .380 || .725 || 1.2 || .7 || .2 || .0 || 4.0
|-
| style="text-align:left;"| 
| style="text-align:left;"| Detroit
| 39 || 1 || 9.8 || .373 || .261 || .750 || .8 || .8 || .3 || .1 || 3.3
|-
| style="text-align:left;"| 
| style="text-align:left;"| San Antonio
| 14 || 0 || 6.8 || .263 || .000 || .857 || .5 || .8 || .1 || .0 || 1.1
|- class="sortbottom"
| style="text-align:center;" colspan="2"| Career
| 91 || 3 || 9.4 || .377 || .304 || .747 || .9 || .8 || .2 || .0 || 3.2

References

External links
 
  
 
 Darrun Hilliard at euroleague.net
 Darrun Hilliard at fiba.com
 

1993 births
Living people
21st-century African-American sportspeople
African-American basketball players
All-American college men's basketball players
American expatriate basketball people in Germany
American expatriate basketball people in Russia
American expatriate basketball people in Spain
American men's basketball players
Austin Spurs players
Basketball players from Pennsylvania
Detroit Pistons draft picks
Detroit Pistons players
FC Bayern Munich basketball players
Grand Rapids Drive players
Liberty High School (Bethlehem, Pennsylvania) alumni
Liga ACB players
Maccabi Tel Aviv B.C. players
PBC CSKA Moscow players
San Antonio Spurs players
Saski Baskonia players
Shooting guards
Sportspeople from Bethlehem, Pennsylvania
United States men's national basketball team players
Villanova Wildcats men's basketball players